Eupithecia cordata is a moth in the family Geometridae. It is found in south-western China (Yunnan, Tibet).

The wingspan is about 16–17 mm. The fore- and hindwings are pale buff-brown.

References

Moths described in 2004
cordata
Moths of Asia